The Art of Romance is an album by Tony Bennett, released in 2004, that won the Grammy Award for Best Traditional Pop Vocal Album. Bennett became a songwriter for the first time in his long career by writing the lyrics for the song "All for You".

Track listing
 "Close Enough for Love" (Johnny Mandel, Paul Williams) – 4:28
 "All in Fun" (Oscar Hammerstein II, Jerome Kern) – 4:08
 "Where Do You Start" (Alan Bergman, Marilyn Bergman, Mandel) – 3:42
 "Little Did I Dream" (Dave Frishberg, Mandel) – 3:45
 "I Remember You" (Johnny Mercer, Victor Schertzinger) – 5:06
 "Time to Smile" (Geoffery Clarkson, Mercer) – 3:24
 "All for You" (Tony Bennett, Django Reinhardt) – 4:35
 "The Best Man" (Roy Alfred, Fred Wise) – 2:52
 "Don't Like Goodbyes" (Harold Arlen, Truman Capote) – 4:15
 "Being Alive" (Stephen Sondheim) – 3:52
 "Gone with the Wind" (Herb Magidson, Allie Wrubel) – 4:16

Personnel
 Tony Bennett – vocals
 Phil Woods – saxophone
 Lee Musiker – piano, arranger
 Paul Langosch – double bass
 Gray Sargent – guitar
 Clayton Cameron – drums
 Candido Camero – conga
 Johnny Mandel – arranger, conductor
 Jorge Calandrelli – arranger
 Jesse Levy – conductor, orchestra contractor

References

2004 albums
Tony Bennett albums
Columbia Records albums
Albums produced by Phil Ramone
Albums arranged by Johnny Mandel
Grammy Award for Best Traditional Pop Vocal Album